Ary Façanha de Sá (1 April 1928 – 16 August 2020) was a Brazilian long jumper. At the 1952 Summer Olympics he finished fourth in the long jump. He also competed at the 1956 Summer Olympics. He became South American long jump champion in 1952, won silver medals in 1956 and 1958 and a bronze medal in 1954. He also won a bronze medal at the 1955 Pan American Games and a gold medal at the 1955 World Student Games.

References
 Ary de Sá's profile at Sports Reference.com

1928 births
2020 deaths
Athletes (track and field) at the 1952 Summer Olympics
Athletes (track and field) at the 1955 Pan American Games
Athletes (track and field) at the 1956 Summer Olympics
Brazilian male long jumpers
Olympic athletes of Brazil
Pan American Games bronze medalists for Brazil
Pan American Games medalists in athletics (track and field)
Medalists at the 1955 Pan American Games